Australian police ranks and insignia are loosely based on the ranks of the United Kingdom police forces and differ between state and territory forces. Ranks listed here descend in seniority from left to right.

Current ranks

Former ranks

Federal

Victoria

Queensland

Northern Territory

Notes

See also 
 Police rank
 Police ranks in Canada
 New Zealand Police ranks
 Police ranks of the United Kingdom

References 

Australia
Non-military rank insignia
Law enforcement in Australia
Law enforcement-related lists
Police ranks